Doleschallini is a tribe of flies in the family Tachinidae.

Genera
Doleschalla Walker, 1861
Torocca Walker, 1859

References

Brachycera tribes
Dexiinae